Deiniol is one of eight electoral wards in the city of Bangor, Gwynedd, Wales, electing councillors to the city and county councils.

Description
The ward covers the centre of the city including the High Street and Bangor Cathedral (dedicated to St Deiniol). It is bounded to the northwest by the A5 road, to the northeast by Maes-y-Dref and to the southwest by the railway. It elects two councillors to Bangor City Council and one county councillor to Gwynedd Council.

The ward population, according to the 2011 Census, was 1,839.

County ward
In the May 2017 county council election Plaid Cymru regained the seat from the Labour Party, having lost it in 2012.

* = sitting councillor prior to the election

A 2018 report by the Boundary Commission for Wales, if agreed, would merge Deiniol with neighbouring Bangor wards to form a new two-member ward. Low voter registration of the university students was blamed for the small electorates in the city.

Welsh Language 
According to the United Kingdom Census 2021, 19.6 per cent of all usual residents aged 3+ in Deiniol can speak Welsh. 27.4 per cent of the population noted that they could speak, read, write or understand Welsh. The 2021 Census showed that Deiniol was the area in Gwynedd that had the highest proportion of its population with no Welsh language skills. According to the 2011 Census, 22.8 per cent of the population could speak Welsh.

See also
 List of electoral wards in Gwynedd
 Glyder (electoral ward)
 Hendre (Bangor electoral ward)

References

Bangor, Gwynedd
Gwynedd electoral wards